Scott Neville (born 11 January 1989) is an Australian professional footballer who plays as a defender for Brisbane Roar in the A-League.

Personal life
Scott Neville is the son of former English Football League pro, Steve Neville. Steve Neville was playing for Exeter City at the time when Scott was born. Scott recently married his partner of five years, Sarah McGeechan, in a lavish marquee wedding in Nedlands, Perth on 24 May 2019.

Career

He made his senior debut for Perth Glory as a substitute on 31 December 2008 against Central Coast Mariners.

He then made a starting debut against Melbourne Victory the next week and was named man of the match by coach Dave Mitchell.

On 31 March 2011 it was announced that Scott Neville had been handed a two-week trial by Championship club Portsmouth. On 2 April 2010, Neville had an unsuccessful trial with Portsmouth. Immediately after he took part in a trial at Sheffield Wednesday.

On 7 May 2012 it was announced he had signed a two-year contract with A-League club Newcastle Jets.

On 25 April 2017, Neville confirmed his departure from Western Sydney Wanderers, and subsequently joined Perth Glory. In his last season for the club, the team finished first in the A-League and were crowned premiers of the league.

On 26 June 2019, Neville departed Perth Glory. A few days later he signed with Brisbane Roar. Later that year on 30 November, Neville scored his first goal for Roar in a 2–0 home victory.

In October 2020, Neville was loaned to SC East Bengal until the end of the 2020–21 Indian Super League season.

Career statistics

Club

Honours
Perth Glory
 A-League Premiership: 2018–19

Individual
A-Leagues All Star: 2022

References

External links
 Perth Glory profile

1989 births
Living people
Association football defenders
Australian soccer players
Australian people of English descent
Perth Glory FC players
Newcastle Jets FC players
Western Sydney Wanderers FC players
Brisbane Roar FC players
East Bengal Club players
A-League Men players
Indian Super League players